Henry Houston "Wiley" Dunham (January 30, 1877 – January 16, 1934) was a professional baseball player.  He was a pitcher for one season (1902) with the St. Louis Cardinals.  For his career, he compiled a 2–3 record, with a 5.68 earned run average, and 13 strikeouts in 38 innings pitched.

He was born in Piketon, Ohio and died in Cleveland, Ohio at the age of 56.

Buried in Mound Cemetery Piketon, Ohio

External links

1877 births
1934 deaths
St. Louis Cardinals players
Major League Baseball pitchers
Baseball players from Ohio
Columbus Senators players
Memphis Egyptians players
New Orleans Pelicans (baseball) players
Birmingham Barons players
People from Pike County, Ohio
Nashville Vols players